John Christian Jacobi, also Johann Christian Jacobi, (1670-1750) was a German-born translator and dealer in religious books, particularly those connected with Halle Pietism. He served as keeper of the Royal German Chapel, St James's Palace from 1714 until his death.

Life and works
In the 1680s Jacobi attended the University of Halle, one of the main centres of Lutheranism, where the leading Pietist August Hermann Francke set up various educational institutions. While at Halle, he came into contact with English students; and in 1708 he moved to England to start work as a translator and bookseller in London, opening a bookshop near Somerset House in the Strand, London in 1709. He specialised in religious tracts, using his contacts with Francke in Halle and John Downing of the Society for Promoting Christian Knowledge in London. Known as the "German bookseller on the Strand", his bookshop imported German bibles, prayer books and hymnals for the German Lutheran community in London, whose activities centred around the Lutheran chapel of St Mary in Savoy. (Heinrich Eler in Halle was one of his main suppliers.) He produced several English translations including Estrid: An Account of a Swedish Maid, who hath Lived Six Years without Food (1711).

In 1712 Jacobi was already married; the baptism of his son John Owen with Mary Magdalen Jacobi was recorded in June 1712 at St Paul's, Covent Garden. Jacobi's bookshop moved to Southampton Row on the Strand in the same year. In 1714 he was appointed "chapel-keeper" (or verger) of the Royal German Chapel, St James's Palace, which provided Lutheran services for the Hanoverian court. The first chaplain there was Francke's main associate in England, Anthony William Boehm, a close friend of Jacobi. In 1717 he moved his business further along the Strand to the less expensive Exeter Exchange, which housed a number of foreign language bookshops. Although Jacobi had tried to diversify to serve a French readership, he stopped selling books by 1719. His German bookshop was the first of its kind in England and it was 30 years before another one opened in London.

In 1722 Jacobi published the first edition of his Psalmodia Germanica, or a Specimen of Divine Hymns, Translated from the High Dutch, a collection of English translations of German Lutheran hymns. The dedication to the Royal Princesses Anne, Amalia and Carolina read, "The following sheets exhibit a translation of psalmody, used in the native country of your Royal Highnesses, which (as well as other protestant countries) is blessed with those spiritual hymns, to the frequent use thereof the Apostle doth so solemnly exhort."  The Psalmodica also contained two works by Isaac Watts. Three editions of Jacobi's hymnbook appeared between 1722 and 1732. After his death a new edition was prepared in 1765, containing some new translations.

Later that year—inspired by Nitschmann but discouraged by Friedrich Michael Ziegenhagen, Boehm's successor at the Royal German Chapel in 1722—Jacobi, accompanied by his three daughters, made the journey to Herrnhut in Saxony, where the original Moravian movement had been offered protection. In the same year Jacobi translated the biography of Boehm by Johann Jacob Rambach into English.

In 1748, the second volume of Lives of Martyrs was published with Jacobi's English translation of a French tract on the Huguenot Elias Neau, entitled "A short account of the life and sufferings of Elias Neau upon the galleys, and in the dungeons of Marseilles, for the constant profession of the Protestant religion." Jacobi's translation was published separately in London the following year.

Jacobi was buried at St Paul's, Covent Garden in 1750.

Gallery

Notes

References

 (subscription required)

External links
 The 1732 edition of Psalmodia Germanica at IMSLP

1670 births
1750 deaths
18th-century Lutherans
German Lutherans
Moravian Church